Andrew Robertson (born 1994) is a Scottish footballer.

Andrew or Andy Robertson may also refer to:

 Andrew Robertson (actor) (born 1941), British actor
 Andrew Robertson (doctor), Australian public health doctor
 Andrew Robertson (sprinter) (born 1990), British sprinter
 Andrew Robertson (businessman) (1827–1890), Canadian businessman and chairman of the Montreal Harbour Commission
 Andrew Robertson (engineer) (1883–1977), British mechanical engineer
 Andrew Robertson (lawyer) (1815–1880), Canadian lawyer, author of legal works
 Andrew Robertson (miniaturist) (1777–1845), Scottish miniaturist portrait painter
 Andrew Robertson (politician) (1865–1934), Australian politician
 Andrew N. Robertson (born 1974), British actor
 Andy W. Robertson, editor of William Hope Hodgson's Night Lands